Marchewka, also spelled Marhefka, is a surname. Notable people with this surname include:

 Arkadiusz Marchewka (born 1986), Polish politician
 Zofia Marchewka (died 1717), Polish witch trial victim
 Joe Marhefka (1902–2003), American football player

See also
 

Polish-language surnames